Ellering is a surname. Notable people with the surname include:

Paul Ellering (born 1953), American wrestler and wrestling manager
Rachael Ellering (born 1992), American wrestler